The 2015–16 Third League (known as the Spor Toto 3. Lig for sponsorship reasons) is the 15th season of the league since its establishment in 2001 as the fourth level division; and the 45th season of the third league in Turkish football since its establishment in 1967–68.

Group 1

Teams

League table

Promotion Playoffs

Semifinals

Finals

Group 2

Teams

League table

Promotion Playoffs

Semifinals

Finals

Group 3

Teams

League table

Promotion Playoffs

Semifinals

Finals

See also 
 2015–16 Turkish Cup
 2015–16 Süper Lig
 2015–16 TFF First League
 2015–16 TFF Second League

References

4
Turk
2015-16